The following articles cover the modern history of Italy:
Italian unification (1815-1861)
History of the Kingdom of Italy (1861–1946)
Italian Fascism
Italian Colonial Empire
 History of the Italian Republic (1945 to present)
Years of Lead (Italy) (1969-1988)
Berlusconi era (2001 to present)

See also
Early Modern Italy

 
!